The Asia District (Distrito de Asia) is one of 16 that make up the Peru province of Cañete. Founded by Beinto Chumpitaz Chavez on July 24, 1964, it was originally part of the Coayllo District.

Asia's beaches overlook the Pacific Ocean making it a popular summer getaway for the residents of Lima, the Peruvian capital, which is an hour drive north.

Asia is bordered by Mala District to the north, Cerro Azul District and Quilmaná District to the south, and Coayllo District to the east. Its principal town is 97.5 kilometers south of Lima, approximately a two-hour drive.

Development

Development of Asia's beaches began in the mid-1970s, with the creation of Las Palmas, the first condominium to be built on the beach. Kerosene lamps lit buildings, as electricity did not arrive until a second condo, Los Cocos, was developed. For many years, running water was not available, and water had to be trucked in.

After the population crisis in Lima in the 1980s, especially in the north of Lima, close to the classic exclusive spas and beach resorts like Ancón, La Punta and Santa Rosa, wealthy families decided to find a better place to settle in summer, especially for privacy.

By the 1990s, a reasonable level of housing development had been reached, but there were few businesses on the Camino Real, the road that connects Asia's beaches to the Panamerican Highway. Among the first businesses were a nightclub called Ibiza, the Sur Market, and a supermarket called Los Tres Chanchitos. Over the course of the decade, a movie theater and an E. Wong supermarket came to the city, along with many small shops and restaurants. Today's Asia's Boulevard has stores offering nearly all the products and services available in Lima.

The Camino Real is now home to the open-air shopping mall Sur Plaza boulevard, which hosts stores, restaurants, and nightclubs. There are movie theaters, children's playgrounds, Peruvian restaurants, and a number of bars and pubs. Along the Asia Beach there are hotels, resorts, and upscale homes.

Beaches
Asia district now encompasses over 5,000 houses in over 30 developments.  Nevertheless, the beach side of the district only works and is populated during the summertime, due to the weather, and the lack of urban conveniences.

The beaches are:
 Playa Bonita
 Sarapampa 
 Las Palmas
 Totoritas
 Puerto Madero
 Los Cocos
 Puerto Fiel
 Chocaya
 Bujama
 Playa el golf
 MarAdentro
 Riviera Francesa
 La Encontrada
 Flamengo
 Formentera

Archaeology
A pre-ceramic archaeological site is located near the mouth of the river of Omas´ quebrada. On the site, there are human remains of a small indigenous population with its respective cemetery. The excavations have revealed several rooms with deposits and passages whose walls have been done with great rectangular adobes. Archaeologists speculate that the site could date back to 1100 BC.

Golf
Recent projects that have been under development are those for the golf course and a condominium development. It is being sponsored by Inmobiliaria Playa del Golf a Real Estate company who has developed other condominiums in the area, such as Playa Blanca, Playa del Sol, Playa Bonita and Playa del Golf Stage I and Stage II. The area that is used as the golf course and contains pure sand which gives the perfect surface for building the golf course at a low cost, using Paspalum grass which is genetically designed for those conditions. The project kickoff date was June 1, 2007 and the course was finished in summer 2009.

See also
 Administrative divisions of Peru
San Vicente
 Cañete Province
Chancay
Miraflores
Ancón
Santa Rosa
Chorrillos
La Punta

External links
 INEI Perú

References